The following highways are numbered 809:

Costa Rica
 National Route 809

United States